The Crown of the Bahadur Shah II is the head dress of last Mughal emperor Bahadur Shah II (r. 1837 – 1857).

History 
It was created in the second quarter 19th century, most probably in Delhi or the surrounding areas by goldsmiths and jewellers. It is strictly speaking not a crown, but an article of head dress. The materials used are gold, turquoises, rubies, diamonds, pearls, emeralds, feathers and velvet. Its dimensions are 28.5 x 23.5 x 23.5 cm.

It is part of the Royal Collection with the inventory number RCIN 67236. It was exhibited at the British Library in 2013.

Further reading 
 Jonathan Marsden. Victoria & Albert: Art & Love. The Royal Collection, London, 2010. 
 Harriet Tytler. An Englishwoman in India: The Memoirs of Harriet Tytler, 1828-58. Oxford Paperbacks, Oxford, 1988.

External links 
 

Bahadur Shah II
Mughal Court
Mughal art
Red Fort
Jewellery of the Royal Collection of the United Kingdom
History of Delhi
Islamic metal art